Prat may refer to:

People
Arturo Prat, a Chilean naval officer
Jean Prat, a French rugby union footballer

Places
 Villa Prat a small city in the O'Higgins Region in Chile
 Capitán Prat Province, the eighth-largest province of Chile
 Capitan Arturo Prat Base, a Chilean research station in the South Shetland Islands
 El Prat de Llobregat, a municipality in Catalonia
 Prat, Côtes-d'Armor, a commune in the Côtes-d'Armor département in France
 Prat Island

Institutions
 Arturo Prat University
 Prat de Punta Arenas

Ships
 See Chilean ship Capitán Prat

See also
 Capitán Prat (disambiguation)
 Pratt (disambiguation)

Occitan-language surnames
Catalan-language surnames